Jonas Budde or Jonas Olufsen Bude, (23 January 1644 – 1710) served a distinguished career in the Norwegian Army, including service at various Norwegian fortresses during the extended period of hostility between Sweden and Denmark-Norway. He served as an officer of Fredrikstad Fortress garrison from 1676 through 1681 (including the period of the Gyldenløve War), was the commanding officer of Christiansfjeld fortress from October 24, 1684, to February 2, 1688, and was lieutenant colonel (Oberstløjtnant) and commanding officer of Stavern Fortress from November 3, 1689, until his death in 1710 at sixty six years of age.

Family
Jonas Budde was married in 1670 in Fredericia, Denmark with Alhed Wiborg, born 29 September 1633 in Malmø, Denmark (modern Sweden), daughter of mayor (borgermester) Niels Wiborg and Karen Hendrichsdatter Franche. She died 19 April 1701 in Stavern with no surviving children.

References
 Denmarke Heer Officerer 1628–1814; by O Ovenstad
 Militærbiografier, den norske hærs officerer 1628–1814 by Olai Ovenstad
 Elverum – en bygdebeskrivelse, vol. 2: Bygdens almindelige historie, institutioner og embedsmænd, by S. H. Finne-Grønn, 1921, pp. 187–188

External links
Budde History

1644 births
1710 deaths
17th-century Danish military personnel
Norwegian Army personnel